"Summertime Girls" is a single by American rock band Y&T. It was released as the first single from their seventh studio album Open Fire. It later reappeared on their eighth studio album Down for the Count. The song became the band's biggest hit, as well as their first and only single to chart on the Billboard Hot 100, peaking at number 55.

Music video
The music video starts off with a homeless person looking through a garbage can at a beach, upon which drummer Leonard Haze emerges from the garbage pile. The video then cuts to vocalist Dave Meniketti and guitarist Joey Alves coming out of a small cave, and then to bassist Phil Kennemore emerging from the sand after being discovered by a man with a metal detector. All four members then meet up as a large crowd approach the beach, when four girls, all dressed in black leather clothing with chains emerge from the crowd, who are seen throughout the video as the band continue hang about the beach. As everyone leaves the beach at sunset, the four girls walk up to the band and walk off with them.

The music video was directed by Rick Friedberg.

Track listing
7" single (US)

7" single (UK)

In other media
The song makes an appearance in the 1985 sci-fi comedy film Real Genius.

The song was featured in the first episode of the HBO Max series Peacemaker.

Charts

References

1985 songs
1985 singles
A&M Records singles
Song recordings produced by Kevin Beamish